Get Up & Dance is the fourth album by The Memphis Horns. It contains the singles "Get Up And Dance" and "What The Funk", as well as the group's biggest hit, the jazzy slow jam "Just For Your Love", which reached #17 on the R&B Charts.

Track listing
"Get Up and Dance" 		
"Just for Your Love" 		
"Waitin' for The Flood"		
"Love is Happiness" 		
"Memphis Nights"
"What The Funk" 		
"Country Soul" 		
"No Go Betweens" 		
"Don't Abuse It" 		
"Keep On Smilin'"

Personnel
Jack Hale - trombone (solo)
James Mitchell - baritone saxophone
Lewis Collins - tenor saxophone, soprano saxophone
Andrew Love - tenor saxophone
Wayne Jackson - trumpet

Charts

Singles

External links
 The Memphis Horns-Get Up & Dance at Discogs

References

1977 albums
The Memphis Horns albums
RCA Records albums